1993 Academy Awards may refer to:

 65th Academy Awards, the Academy Awards ceremony that took place in 1993
 66th Academy Awards, the 1994 ceremony honoring the best in film for 1993